Andinosaura is a genus of lizards in the family Gymnophthalmidae. The genus is endemic to South America.

Species
The genus Andinosaura contains 11 species which are recognized as being valid.
Andinosaura afrania 
Andinosaura aurea 
Andinosaura crypta 
Andinosaura hyposticta  - Boulenger's lightbulb lizard
Andinosaura kiziriani 
Andinosaura laevis  - shiny lightbulb lizard
Andinosaura oculata  - tropical lightbulb lizard
Andinosaura petrorum 
Andinosaura stellae 
Andinosaura vespertina 
Andinosaura vieta 

Nota bene: A binomial authority in parentheses indicates that the species was originally described in a genus other than Andinosaura.

References

 
Lizard genera
Taxa named by Santiago J. Sánchez-Pacheco
Taxa named by Omar Torres-Carvajal
Taxa named by Vanessa Aguirre-Peñafiel
Taxa named by Pedro M. Sales-Nunes
Taxa named by Laura Verrastro
Taxa named by Gilson Rivas
Taxa named by Miguel Trefaut Rodrigues
Taxa named by Taran Grant
Taxa named by Robert W. Murphy